The following radio stations broadcast on FM frequency 82.5 MHz:

Japan
JOAK-FM at Tokyo

Turkey
TRT-2 at Adana

Lists of radio stations by frequency